In computer programming, the interpreter pattern is a design pattern that specifies how to evaluate sentences in a language.
The basic idea is to have a class for each symbol (terminal or nonterminal) in a specialized computer language. The syntax tree of a sentence in the language is an instance of the composite pattern and is used to evaluate (interpret) the sentence for a client. See also Composite pattern.

Overview
The Interpreter

design pattern is one of the twenty-three well-known 
GoF design patterns 
that describe how to solve recurring design problems to design flexible and reusable object-oriented software, that is, objects that are easier to implement, change, test, and reuse.

What problems can the Interpreter design pattern solve?
 A grammar for a simple language should be defined
 so that sentences in the language can be interpreted.

When a problem occurs very often, it could be considered to represent it as a sentence in a simple language
(Domain Specific Languages) so that an interpreter can solve the problem
by interpreting the sentence.

For example, when many different or complex search expressions must be specified.
Implementing (hard-wiring) them directly into a class is inflexible
because it commits the class to particular expressions and makes it impossible to specify new expressions or change existing ones independently from (without having to change) the class.

What solution does the Interpreter design pattern describe?
 Define a grammar for a simple language by defining an Expression class hierarchy and implementing an interpret() operation.
 Represent a sentence in the language by an abstract syntax tree (AST) made up of Expression instances.
 Interpret a sentence by calling interpret() on the AST.

The expression objects are composed recursively into a composite/tree structure that is called
abstract syntax tree (see Composite pattern).
The Interpreter pattern doesn't describe how
to build an abstract syntax tree. This can
be done either manually by a client or automatically by a parser.

See also the UML class and object diagram below.

Uses 
 Specialized database query languages such as SQL.
 Specialized computer languages that are often used to describe communication protocols.
 Most general-purpose computer languages actually incorporate several specialized languages.

Structure

UML class and object diagram 

In the above UML class diagram, the Client class refers to the common AbstractExpression interface for interpreting an expression
interpret(context).

The TerminalExpression class has no children and interprets an expression directly.

The NonTerminalExpression class maintains a container of child expressions
(expressions) and forwards interpret requests
to these expressions.

The object collaboration diagram 
shows the run-time interactions: The Client object sends an interpret request to the abstract syntax tree.
The request is forwarded to (performed on) all objects downwards the tree structure.
The NonTerminalExpression objects (ntExpr1,ntExpr2) forward the request to their child expressions.
The TerminalExpression objects (tExpr1,tExpr2,…) perform the interpretation directly.

UML class diagram

Examples

BNF 
The following Backus–Naur form example illustrates the interpreter pattern. The grammar

expression ::= plus | minus | variable | number
plus ::= expression expression '+'
minus ::= expression expression '-'
variable ::= 'a' | 'b' | 'c' | ... | 'z'
digit = '0' | '1' | ... | '9'
number ::= digit | digit number
defines a language that contains Reverse Polish Notation expressions like:

a b +
a b c + -
a b + c a - -

C# 
This structural code demonstrates the Interpreter patterns, which using a defined grammar, provides the interpreter that processes parsed statements.

using System;
using System.Collections.Generic;

namespace OOP;

class Program
{
    static void Main()
    {
        var context = new Context();
        var input = new MyExpression();

        var expression = new OrExpression
        {
            Left = new EqualsExpression
            {
                Left = input,
                Right = new MyExpression { Value = "4" }
            },
            Right = new EqualsExpression
            {
                Left = input,
                Right = new MyExpression { Value = "four" }
            }
        };

        input.Value = "four";
        expression.Interpret(context);
        // Output: "true" 
        Console.WriteLine(context.Result.Pop());

        input.Value = "44";
        expression.Interpret(context);
        // Output: "false"
        Console.WriteLine(context.Result.Pop());
    }
}

class Context
{
    public Stack<string> Result = new Stack<string>();
}

interface IExpression
{
    void Interpret(Context context);
}

abstract class OperatorExpression : IExpression
{
    public IExpression Left { private get; set; }
    public IExpression Right { private get; set; }

    public void Interpret(Context context)
    {
        Left.Interpret(context);
        string leftValue = context.Result.Pop();

        Right.Interpret(context);
        string rightValue = context.Result.Pop();

        DoInterpret(context, leftValue, rightValue);
    }

    protected abstract void DoInterpret(Context context, string leftValue, string rightValue);
}

class EqualsExpression : OperatorExpression
{
    protected override void DoInterpret(Context context, string leftValue, string rightValue)
    {
        context.Result.Push(leftValue == rightValue ? "true" : "false");
    }
}

class OrExpression : OperatorExpression
{
    protected override void DoInterpret(Context context, string leftValue, string rightValue)
    {
        context.Result.Push(leftValue == "true" || rightValue == "true" ? "true" : "false");
    }
}

class MyExpression : IExpression
{
    public string Value { private get; set; }

    public void Interpret(Context context)
    {
        context.Result.Push(Value);
    }
}

Java 
public class Interpreter {
    @FunctionalInterface
    public interface Expr {
        int interpret(Map<String, Integer> context);
        
        static Expr number(int number) {
            return context -> number;
        }
        
        static Expr plus(Expr left, Expr right) {
            return context -> left.interpret(context) + right.interpret(context);
        }
        
        static Expr minus(Expr left, Expr right) {
            return context -> left.interpret(context) - right.interpret(context);
        }
        
        static Expr variable(String name) {
            return context -> context.getOrDefault(name, 0);
        }
    }
}

While the interpreter pattern does not address parsing, a parser is provided for completeness.

    private static Expr parseToken(String token, ArrayDeque<Expr> stack) {
        Expr left, right;
        switch(token) {
        case "+":
            // It's necessary to remove first the right operand from the stack
            right = stack.pop();
            // ...and then the left one
            left = stack.pop();
            return Expr.plus(left, right);
        case "-":
            right = stack.pop();
            left = stack.pop();
            return Expr.minus(left, right);
        default:
            return Expr.variable(token);
        }
    }
    public static Expr parse(String expression) {
        ArrayDeque<Expr> stack = new ArrayDeque<Expr>();
        for (String token : expression.split(" ")) {
            stack.push(parseToken(token, stack));
        }
        return stack.pop();
    }

Finally evaluating the expression "w x z - +" with w = 5, x = 10, and z = 42.

    public static void main(final String[] args) {
        Expr expr = parse("w x z - +");
        Map<String, Integer> context = Map.of("w", 5, "x", 10, "z", 42);
        int result = expr.interpret(context);
        System.out.println(result);        // -27
    }
}

PHP (Example 1) 
/**
 * AbstractExpression
 */
interface Expression
{
    public function interpret(array $context): int;
}

/**
 * TerminalExpression
 */
class TerminalExpression implements Expression
{
    /** @var string */
    private $name;

    public function __construct(string $name)
    {
        $this->name = $name;
    }

    public function interpret(array $context): int
    {
        return intval($context[$this->name]);
    }
}

/**
 * NonTerminalExpression
 */
abstract class NonTerminalExpression implements Expression
{
    /** @var Expression $left */
    protected $left;

    /** @var ?Expression $right */
    protected $right;

    public function __construct(Expression $left, ?Expression $right)
    {
        $this->left = $left;
        $this->right = $right;
    }

    abstract public function interpret(array $context): int;
    
    public function getRight()
    {
        return $this->right;
    }

    public function setRight($right): void
    {
        $this->right = $right;
    }
}

/**
 * NonTerminalExpression - PlusExpression
 */
class PlusExpression extends NonTerminalExpression
{
    public function interpret(array $context): int
    {
        return intval($this->left->interpret($context) + $this->right->interpret($context));
    }
}

/**
 * NonTerminalExpression - MinusExpression
 */
class MinusExpression extends NonTerminalExpression
{
    public function interpret(array $context): int
    {
        return intval($this->left->interpret($context) - $this->right->interpret($context));
    }
}

/**
 * Client
 */
class InterpreterClient
{
    protected function parseList(array &$stack, array $list, int &$index)
    {
        /** @var string $token */
        $token = $list[$index];

        switch($token) {
            case '-':
                list($left, $right) = $this->fetchArguments($stack, $list, $index);
                return new MinusExpression($left, $right);
            case '+':
                list($left, $right) = $this->fetchArguments($stack, $list, $index);
                return new PlusExpression($left, $right);
            default:
                return new TerminalExpression($token);
        }
    }

    protected function fetchArguments(array &$stack, array $list, int &$index): array
    {
        /** @var Expression $left */
        $left = array_pop($stack);
        /** @var Expression $right */
        $right = array_pop($stack);
        if ($right === null) {
            ++$index;
            $this->parseListAndPush($stack, $list, $index);
            $right = array_pop($stack);
        }

        return array($left, $right);
    }

    protected function parseListAndPush(array &$stack, array $list, int &$index)
    {
        array_push($stack, $this->parseList($stack, $list, $index));
    }

    protected function parse(string $data): Expression
    {
        $stack = [];
        $list = explode(' ', $data);
        for ($index=0; $index<count($list); $index++) {
            $this->parseListAndPush($stack, $list, $index);
        }

        return array_pop($stack);
    }

    public function main()
    {
        $data = "u + v - w + z";
        $expr = $this->parse($data);
        $context = ['u' => 3, 'v' => 7, 'w' => 35, 'z' => 9];
        $res = $expr->interpret($context);
        echo "result: $res" . PHP_EOL;
    }
}

// test.php

function loadClass($className)
{
    require_once  . "/$className.php";
}

spl_autoload_register('loadClass');

(new InterpreterClient())->main();
//result: -16

PHP (Example 2) 
Based on the example above with another realization of the client.

/**
 * Client
 */
class InterpreterClient
{
    public function parseToken(string $token, array &$stack): Expression
    {
        switch($token) {
            case '-':
                /** @var Expression $left */
                $left = array_pop($stack);
                /** @var Expression $right */
                $right = array_pop($stack);
                return new MinusExpression($left, $right);
            case '+':
                /** @var Expression $left */
                $left = array_pop($stack);
                /** @var Expression $right */
                $right = array_pop($stack);
                return new PlusExpression($left, $right);
            default:
                return new TerminalExpression($token);
        }
    }

    public function parse(string $data): Expression
    {
        $unfinishedData = null;
        $stack = [];
        $list = explode(' ', $data);
        foreach ($list as $token) {
            $data = $this->parseToken($token, $stack);
            if (
                ($unfinishedData instanceof NonTerminalExpression) &&
                ($data instanceof TerminalExpression)
            ) {
                $unfinishedData->setRight($data);
                array_push($stack, $unfinishedData);
                $unfinishedData = null;
                continue;
            }
            if ($data instanceof NonTerminalExpression) {
                if ($data->getRight() === null) {
                    $unfinishedData = $data;
                    continue;
                }
            }
            array_push($stack, $data);
        }

        return array_pop($stack);
    }

    public function main()
    {
        $data = "u + v - w + z";
        $expr = $this->parse($data);
        $context = ['u' => 3, 'v' => 7, 'w' => 35, 'z' => 9];
        $res = $expr->interpret($context);
        echo "result: $res" . PHP_EOL;
    }
}

JavaScript 
As JavaScript is dynamically typed, we do not implement an interface.
// Nonterminal expression
class Plus {
    a;
    b;
    constructor(a, b) {
        this.a = a;
        this.b = b;
    }
    interpret(context) {
        return this.a.interpret(context) + this.b.interpret(context);
    }
}
// Nonterminal expression
class Minus {
    a;
    b;
    constructor(a, b) {
        this.a = a;
        this.b = b;
    }
    interpret(context) {
        return this.a.interpret(context) - this.b.interpret(context);
    }
}
// Nonterminal expression
class Times {
    a;
    b;
    constructor(a, b) {
        this.a = a;
        this.b = b;
    }
    interpret(context) {
        return this.a.interpret(context) * this.b.interpret(context);
    }
}
// Nonterminal expression
class Divide {
    a;
    b;
    constructor(a, b) {
        this.a = a;
        this.b = b;
    }
    interpret(context) {
        return this.a.interpret(context) / this.b.interpret(context);
    }
}
// Terminal expression
class Number {
    a;
    constructor(a, b) {
        this.a = a;
    }
    interpret(context) {
        return this.a; 
    }
}
// Terminal expression
class Variable {
    a;
    constructor(a) {
        this.a = a;
    }
    interpret(context) {
        return context[this.a] || 0;
    }
}
// Client
class Parse {
    context;
    constructor(context) {
        this.context = context;
    }
    parse(expression) {
        let tokens = expression.split(" ");
        let queue = [];
        for (let token of tokens) {
            switch (token) {
                case "+":
                    var b = queue.pop();
                    var a = queue.pop();
                    var exp = new Plus(a, b);
                    queue.push(exp);
                break;
                case "/":
                    var b = queue.pop();
                    var a = queue.pop();
                    var exp = new Divide(a, b);
                    queue.push(exp);
                break;
                case "*":
                    var b = queue.pop();
                    var a = queue.pop();
                    var exp = new Times(a, b);
                    queue.push(exp);
                break;
                case "-":
                    var b = queue.pop();
                    var a = queue.pop();
                    var exp = new Minus(a, b);
                    queue.push(exp);
                break;
                default:
                    if (isNaN(token)) {
                        var exp = new Variable(token);
                        queue.push(exp);   
                    } else {
                        var number = parseInt(token);
                        var exp = new Number(number);
                        queue.push(exp);
                    }
                break;
            } 
        }
        let main = queue.pop();
        return main.interpret(this.context);
    }
}
var res = new Parse({v: 45}).parse("16 v * 76 22 - -");
console.log(res)
//666

See also 
 Backus–Naur form
 Combinatory logic in computing
 Design Patterns
 Domain-specific language
 Interpreter (computing)

References

External links 

 Interpreter implementation in Ruby
 Interpreter implementation in C++
 SourceMaking tutorial
 Interpreter pattern description from the Portland Pattern Repository

Articles with example C Sharp code
Articles with example Java code
Software design patterns